The following is a comprehensive list of the acting and directing credits of American actress Kathy Bates. With over 200 acting and directing credits to her name, Bates is perhaps best known for her breakout role in the 1990 horror film Misery, based on the novel of the same name by Stephen King. Her role as Annie Wilkes was met with much praise, earning her the Academy Award for Best Actress and Golden Globe Award for Best Actress – Motion Picture Drama the following year. Since then she has acted in numerous other films, in both comedy and drama categories, earning two additional Academy Award nominations as well as seven total Golden Globe Award nominations.

In 2011, Bates starred as Harriet Korn on the NBC legal drama series Harry's Law, her first starring role on television. The show ran for two seasons and Bates was nominated for two consecutive Primetime Emmy Awards. In 2013, she starred in the third season of the FX anthology horror series American Horror Story, subtitled American Horror Story: Coven. Bates won her second Emmy Award for her role in the series.

Actress

Film

Television films

Television

Theatre

Director

See also
List of awards and nominations received by Kathy Bates
List of 1990 box office number-one films in the United States
List of 1991 box office number-one films in the United States

References

External links

Actress filmographies
American filmographies